Union is the debut album of the rock band Union.

Reception
The album did relatively well for a lower profile release. It peaked at #36th on the Heatseekers Billboard Chart in 1998. Alex Henderson of AMG called it "superb" and one 1998's strongest rock releases.

Track listing

(*) Only available on the Japanese bonus track version of the album

Personnel
Adapted from the AllMusic credits.
John Corabi - guitar, vocals, producer
Brent Fitz - drums, vocals
Jamie Hunting - bass, vocals
Bruce Kulick - guitar, vocals, producer
Curt Coumo - producer
John Buttino - art director
William Hames - photography
Jim Mitchell - mixing
Patrick Shevelin - mixing
David Dominguez - engineer
Shawn Berman - engineer
Kenny Ybarra - assistant engineer
Stephen Marcussen - mastering

References

1998 debut albums